The Pelham Range is a small mountain range on southern Vancouver Island, British Columbia, Canada, located northeast of Sarita and between the Sarita River and Alberni Inlet. It has an area of 52 km2 and is a subrange of the Vancouver Island Ranges which in turn form part of the Insular Mountains.

See also
List of mountain ranges

References

Vancouver Island Ranges
Mountain ranges of British Columbia